Geophis isthmicus, also known as the isthmian earth snake, is a snake of the colubrid family. It is found in Mexico.

References

Geophis
Snakes of North America
Reptiles of Mexico
Endemic fauna of Mexico
Taxa named by George Albert Boulenger
Reptiles described in 1894